Victor Chocquet (9 December 1821 – 7 April 1891) was a French art collector and an ardent propagandist of Impressionism. As a senior editor at the Directorate-General of Customs and Indirect Taxes, he was present at all the exhibitions where he defended painters confronted with mockery and insults. His collection was huge. It was dispersed after his death in 1899. Many of the paintings are currently in American museums.

Life 
Chocquet was born in Lille in a wealthy family of silk millers. At a very young age, he devoted all his resources to the purchase of works of art: paintings (including those of Eugène Delacroix, Gustave Courbet, Honoré Daumier) porcelain, and furniture. In 1875, when he attended the 1875 Impressionist sale at the Hôtel Drouot, he fell in love with the paintings hooted by the audience. He asked Auguste Renoir to paint a portrait of his wife and their little daughter Marie-Sophie who died at the age of five, based on a photograph. During this first sale of the "Société anonyme des artistes" at the Hôtel Drouot on 24 March 1875, the painters' receipts did not cover their expenses, the average price of a painting amounting to 100 fr.

Particularly enthusiastic about Paul Cézanne whose paintings he saw at Père Tanguy's home, he spent a lot of energy verbally defending the painters at the 1876 and 1877 exhibitions to which he lent works from his collection. Despite the quolibets that welcomed Cézanne's presentation of his own portrait and despite violent criticism from the press, he was not discouraged, even when his resources diminished when he took early retirement (1877). From 1882, his mother-in-law's inheritance allowed him to resume his purchases and he acquired a property in Hattenville (Normandy) where a large number of works, including Ferme à Hattenville, by Cézanne, were painted. His collection rivaled those of the greatest collectors: he was often quoted at the same time as Georges de Bellio and Eugène Murer in the press. He owned about 32 paintings by Cézanne.

In Paris, Victor Chocquet first lived in an apartment rue de Rivoli that overlooked the Tuileries Garden. It is from there that Monet painted several paintings, including Vue sur le jardin des Tuileries (1876). huile sur toile de 53.97 x 73.2. At the end of his life, he moved to a small 18th-century mansion house, rue Monsigny.

Chocquet died in Paris on 7 April 1891 at age 69.

Portraits and paintings

References

Bibliography

External links 

1821 births
1891 deaths
Artists from Lille
French art collectors
French patrons of the arts
Impressionism